The following is a list of political parties in Yukon, Canada. Between 1902 and 1978, candidates in elections for the Yukon Territorial Council all ran as independents. Party politics was established in the territory for the 1978 territorial election in preparation for the 1979 introduction of responsible government and the devolution of many responsibilities from the federal government to the new Yukon Legislative Assembly.

Yukon is the only of the three Canadian territories which has political parties operating on a territorial level. Both Nunavut and the Northwest Territories operate their legislatures on a non-partisan consensus government model.

Parties represented in the Legislative Assembly

Other parties recognized by Elections Yukon

Defunct parties

References

Yukon
Parties

fr:Partis politiques canadiens#Yukon